The Turin tramway network is an important part, along with the Turin Metro, of the public transport network of the city and comune of Turin, in the Piedmont region, northwest Italy.

The network

Urban lines
The Turin tramway network has 10 lines (for a total of 11 routes):
 3 Corso Tortona - Piazzale Vallette (9,35 km) 
 4 Strada del Drosso - Via delle Querce (17,8 km) 
 7 storica Piazza Castello (circular) (6,9 km) (operated solely by heritage trams)
 9 Piazza Stampalia - Corso Massimo D'Azeglio (9,4 km)
 9/ Piazza Bernini - Juventus Stadium (5,5 km)
 10 feriale Piazza Statuto - Corso Settembrini (limited operations due to track work)
 13 feriale Piazza Campanella - Piazza Gran Madre (6,7 km)
 15 Via Brissogne - Piazza Coriolano (11,5 km)
 16 cs Piazza Sabotino (circular) (12 km)
 16 cd Piazza Sabotino (circular) (12 km) 
 Sassi-Superga Tramway Piazza Gustavo Modena - Basilica di Superga (3,1 km)

Light rail
Of the urban lines, lines 3 and 9 were created as a light rail tram system in the 1980s. Today, line 3 is called a "fully protected" route, while line 9 is considered an ordinary tramway.

Line 4 has characteristics similar to line 3, although another type of tram vehicle is used. In any case, this line also includes long stretches of reserved sections to permit higher speeds.

On line 3, light rail vehicles of the series 7000 were used.

Rolling stock

See also

 Turin Metro
 List of town tramway systems in Italy

 History of rail transport in Italy
 Rail transport in Italy

References

Sources

External links
 
 Images of the Turin tramway network, at photorail.com
 Images of the Turin tramway network, at railfaneurope.net
 Images of the Turin tramway network, at public-transport.net

Turin
Transport in Turin
Railway lines in Piedmont
Tourist attractions in Turin
1871 establishments in Italy
1445 mm gauge railways
600 V DC railway electrification
Turin